Akun Tehdas (English: Aku's Factory) is the third album by Eppu Normaali. It was released on 19 February 1980. On the album, the band lastly switched their style from punk rock to new wave. Mikko Saarela wasn't Eppu Normaali's bassist on the album, but he still wrote lyrics to it. Akun Tehdas was the first album to include Mikko "Vaari" Nevalainen on bass.

Track listing 
Vanha kellarissa valittaa (Old person complains in the cellar)
Minun aurinkolasit (My sunglasses)
Suomi-ilmiö (The Finland syndrome)
Poltan loppuun tupakin (I finish my cigarette)
Puhtoinen lähiöni (My clean suburbia)
 Akun tehdas (Aku's factory)
Puhtoiset vesistömme (Our clean waters)
Vanha poika (Old boy)
Bob Dylan (Bob Dylan)
Jäähyväiset rock'n'rollille (The goodbye's to rock'n'roll)
Viimeinen funk (The last funk)

Eppu Normaali albums
1980 albums
Finnish-language albums